The Open Graphics Project (OGP) was founded with the goal to design an open-source hardware / open architecture and standard for graphics cards, primarily targeting free software / open-source operating systems. The project created a reprogrammable development and prototyping board and had aimed to eventually produce a full-featured and competitive end-user graphics card.

OGD1 

The project's first product was a PCI graphics card dubbed OGD1, which used a field-programmable gate array (FPGA) chip. Although the card could not compete with graphics cards on the market at the time in terms of performance or functionality, it was intended to be useful as a tool for prototyping the project's first application-specific integrated circuit (ASIC) board, as well as for other professionals needing programmable graphics cards or FPGA-based prototyping boards. It was also hoped that this prototype would attract enough interest to gain some profit and attract investors for the next card, since it was expected to cost around US$2,000,000 to start the production of a specialized ASIC design. PCI Express and/or Mini-PCI variations were planned to follow. The OGD1 began shipping in September 2010, some six years after the project began and 3 years after the appearance of the first prototypes.

Full specifications will be published and open-source device drivers will be released. All RTL will be released. Source code to the device drivers and BIOS will be released under the MIT and BSD licenses. The RTL (in Verilog) used for the FPGA and the RTL used for the ASIC are planned to be released under the GNU General Public License (GPL).

It has 256 MiB of DDR RAM, is passively cooled, and follows the DDC, EDID, DPMS and VBE VESA standards. TV-out is also planned.

Versioning schema 
Versioning schema for OGD1 will go like this:

{Root Number} – {Video Memory}{Video Output Interfaces}{Special Options e.g.: A1 OGA firmware installed}

OGD1 components 

Main components of OGD1 graphics card (shown on the picture)

A) DVI transmitter pair A
B) DVI transmitter pair B
C) 330MHz triple 10-bit DAC (behind)
D) TV chip
E) 2x4 256 megabit DDR SDRAM (front, behind)
F) Xilinx 3S4000 FPGA (main chip)
G) Lattice XP10 FPGA (host interface)
H) SPI PROM 1 Mibit
J) SPI PROM 16 Mibit
K) 3x 500 MHz DACs (optional)
L) 64-bit PCI-X edge connector
M) DVI-I connector A and connector B
N) S-Video connector
O) 100-pin expansion bus connector

Divisions/terms related to OGP 
Open Graphics Project (OGP)The group of people developing OGA, its written documentation, and its products.
Open Graphics Architecture (OGA)The trade name for open graphics architectures specified by the Open Graphics Project.
Open Graphics Development (OGD)The initial FPGA-based experimentation board used as a test platform for TRV ASICs.
Traversal Technology (TRV)The commercial name for the first ASIC products, based on the Open Graphics Architecture.
Open Graphics Card (OGC)Graphics cards based on TRV chips.
Open Hardware Foundation (OHF)A non-profit corporation whose charter is to promote the design and production of open-source and open-documentation hardware.

See also 

 Graphics hardware and FOSS
 Open-source hardware
 Open system (computing)
 RISC-V

References

External links
 The official Open Graphics wiki
 
 Project VGA – another free graphics core project, aiming at cheaper hardware
 Manticore – an older FPGA-based free graphics core implementation. As of 2009-05-04 no source is available.
 The master thesis "An FPGA-based 3D Graphics System" illustrates very well the design decisions to make, while developing a FPGA-based 3D graphics core.
 The master thesis "A performance-driven SoC architecture for video synthesis" gives a more complete and hands-on approach of some aspects.

Graphics hardware
Information technology projects
Open hardware electronic devices
Open-source hardware
Graphics cards